Michael David Smith is a writer based in Chicago. In 2007 he was named Mainstream Media Sports Blogger of the Year by Sports Illustrated.

Smith is best known for his work at the AOL FanHouse on MMA. He has also written for The New York Times, The New York Sun, ESPN The Magazine, Fox Sports, Football Outsiders, Profootballtalk.com, and the Orange County Register.

External links

Living people
American sportswriters
Year of birth missing (living people)